San Salvatore may refer to:

Places
San Salvatore di Fitalia, Province of Messina, Italy
San Salvatore Monferrato, Province of Alessandria, Italy
San Salvatore Telesino, Province of Benevento, Italy
Abbadia San Salvatore, Province of Siena, Italy

Buildings
San Salvatore, Brescia, Lombard monastery church and a UNESCO World Cultural Heritage site in Italy
Church of San Salvatore, Campi
Castello San Salvatore
Fort San Salvatore
San Salvatore Monastery, Chania, Crete, Greece
Bastion of San Salvatore, Chania, Crete, Greece

Other uses
San Salvatore, synonym of Holy Saviour
San Salvatore (film), 1955 West German film
Monte San Salvatore, small mountain in Lugano, in Italian-speaking Switzerland

See also
Salvatore (disambiguation)